The Carlos Lattin House was built by Sycamore, Illinois' first permanent settler, Carlos Lattin. It lies within the boundaries of the Sycamore Historic District and is listed as one of the contributing structures in the district. The Sycamore Historic District was added to the National Register of Historic Places in 1978.

History
The house, in the 300 block of Somonauk Street in Sycamore, was erected in 1854 by the city's first permanent settler, Carlos Lattin, who arrived in Sycamore in 1835. He prospered as a farmer and grain and lumber dealer, worked as a correspondent for the Chicago Democrat, that city's first newspaper, and served as DeKalb County treasurer.

Architecture
The house is designed in the Greek Revival style and features exterior brick construction.

References

Houses in DeKalb County, Illinois
Buildings and structures in Sycamore Historic District
Houses completed in 1854
Historic district contributing properties in Illinois
National Register of Historic Places in DeKalb County, Illinois
Houses on the National Register of Historic Places in Illinois